Highway 301 (AR 301, Ark. 301 and Hwy. 301) is a north–south state highway in Pike County, Arkansas. The route of  runs from Highway 26/Highway 27 in Murfreesboro through rural Pike County to Highway 29 in Antoine.

Route description
Highway 301 begins at Highway 26/Highway 27 at the Pike County Courthouse square in Murfreesboro. The square also contains the Murfreesboro Cities Service Station and Conway Hotel, both on the National Register of Historic Places. The route runs south at Washington Avenue before exiting town to the south. Highway 301 serves as the northern edge of Crater of Diamonds State Park, the world's only active diamond mind open to the public. South of the park the highway becomes a rural route, passing east through forested lands. AR 301 has a junction with Highway 195 south of Pigsah and Highway 19 at Piney Grove.

Further east of this junction, the highway forms a concurrency with Highway 29. After breaking from the overlap, Highway 301 turns due east then due north to enter Antoine. The route intersects Main Street and terminates very close to Highway 26.

History
Highway 301 was added to the state highway system as part of a large transfer of county roads to the state system that took place on April 24, 1963. Initially only the portion from Murfreesboro to Billstown was transferred to state maintenance.

Major intersections
Mile markers reset at concurrencies.

See also

 List of state highways in Arkansas

References

External links

301
Transportation in Pike County, Arkansas